John Robert Fish was a  NASCAR Grand National Series race car owner whose career spanned from 1955 to 1958.

Career 
He was the possible inventor of the "Iron Lung" (formally known as a negative pressure ventilator) for his wife who was suffering from circulation problems. Another occasion had Fish cable the President of the United States on a lecture about using a simple pressure box to rescue sailors on a submarine.

He employed Fireball Roberts and Tommy Thompson as his main drivers. They started an average of 11th place and finished an average of 45th place. Fish's drivers would lead only 4 laps out of 106. Fireball Roberts' 11th place championship finish in 1958 was the best accomplishment in Fish's career. Mr. Fish would eventually walk away from his NASCAR career earning a meager $390 ($ when adjusted for inflation). Fish would also be the inventor of the famous "Fish Carburetor" which was first made in the early 1930s.

However, the "Original Equipment" establishment felt that it was an intolerable threat, and Mr. Fish would suffer many years of dirty tricks, harassment and persecution. Fish would eventually move to Florida where he could sell his products to wealthy game fishermen without the harassment he had back in California. Compared to the standard carburetors of that time, Fish's carburetor helped to stop the needless waste of fuel on cornering, braking, and hard acceleration.

For the time, it was considered to be "environmentally friendly" for that reason alone. Today, NASCAR uses fuel injection, which has made carburetors obsolete in the Sprint Cup Series.

References

Possibly living people
NASCAR team owners
Year of birth missing